Daniel Rondeau (born 7 May 1948) is a French writer, editor, and diplomat. Born in Le Mesnil-sur-Oger, he studied law at Panthéon-Assas where the spirit of May 68 saw him embrace Maoism and join the proletariat by working from 1970 to 1974 in a factory in Nancy making insulation. He worked for France Inter's Nord-Est radio station from 1977, before moving to Paris, where he worked for the newspapers Libération (1982–1985) Le Nouvel Observateur (1985–1998) and L'Express (1998–2007). He was French ambassador to Malta (2008–2011) and to UNESCO (2011–2013). He has written fiction, reportage, literary criticism and political commentary, and for his oeuvre won the Grand prix de littérature Paul-Morand in 1998. After unsuccessfully standing for election to the Académie Française in 2011 and 2016, he was elected to seat 8 in 2019.

Works

Honours
French
 Chevalier of the Legion of Honour 
 Commander of the Ordre des Arts et des Lettres 
 Chevalier of the Ordre du Mérite Maritime 
Foreign (honorary)
 Officer of the National Order of Merit (Malta) 
 Commander of the National Order of the Cedar (Lebanon)

References

Living people
1948 births
French editors
20th-century French male writers
20th-century French essayists
20th-century French journalists
20th-century French non-fiction writers
20th-century French novelists
21st-century French male writers
21st-century French essayists
21st-century French journalists
21st-century French non-fiction writers
21st-century French novelists
Boxing writers
French travel writers
Ambassadors of France to Malta
Permanent Delegates of France to UNESCO
Members of the Académie Française
Chevaliers of the Légion d'honneur
Commandeurs of the Ordre des Arts et des Lettres
Recipients of the National Order of Merit (Malta)
People from Marne (department)
Paris 2 Panthéon-Assas University alumni
French Maoists
Grand Prix du roman de l'Académie française winners